Raymond Boyce (28 June 1891 – 20 January 1941) was an Australian cricketer. He played two first-class matches for New South Wales in 1921/22.

See also
 List of New South Wales representative cricketers

References

External links
 

1891 births
1941 deaths
Australian cricketers
New South Wales cricketers
People from Taree
Cricketers from New South Wales